One Law for All is a 1920 American short silent Western film directed by Leo D. Maloney and featuring Hoot Gibson.

Cast
 Hoot Gibson
 Dorothy Wood
 Jim Corey
 Leo D. Maloney (credited as Leo Maloney)

See also
 Hoot Gibson filmography

External links
 

1920 films
1920 Western (genre) films
1920 short films
American silent short films
American black-and-white films
Films directed by Leo D. Maloney
Silent American Western (genre) films
1920s American films
1920s English-language films